The spaghetti-tree hoax was a three-minute hoax report broadcast on April Fools' Day 1957 by the BBC current-affairs programme Panorama, purportedly showing a family in southern Switzerland harvesting spaghetti from the family "spaghetti tree". At the time spaghetti was relatively unknown in the UK, so many British people were unaware that it is made from wheat flour and water; a number of viewers afterwards contacted the BBC for advice on growing their own spaghetti trees. Decades later, CNN called this broadcast "the biggest hoax that any reputable news establishment ever pulled".

Broadcast
The news report was produced as an April Fools' Day joke in 1957, and presented a family in the canton of Ticino in southern Switzerland gathering a bumper spaghetti harvest after a mild winter and "virtual disappearance of the spaghetti weevil". Footage of a traditional "Harvest Festival" was aired along with a discussion of the breeding necessary to develop a strain to produce the perfect spaghetti noodle length. Some scenes were filmed at the (now closed) Pasta Foods factory on London Road, St Albans, in Hertfordshire, and at a hotel in Castagnola, Switzerland.

Panorama cameraman Charles de Jaeger dreamed up the story after remembering how teachers at his school in Austria teased his classmates for being so stupid that if they were told that spaghetti grew on trees, they would believe it. The editor of Panorama, Michael Peacock, told the BBC in 2014 how he gave de Jaeger a budget of £100 and sent him off. The report was made more believable through its voice-over by respected broadcaster Richard Dimbleby. Peacock said Dimbleby knew they were using his authority to make the joke work, and that Dimbleby loved the idea and went at it eagerly.

At the time, 7 million of the 15.8 million homes (about 44%) in Britain had television receivers. Pasta was not an everyday food in 1950s Britain, and it was known mainly from tinned spaghetti in tomato sauce and considered by many to be an exotic delicacy. An estimated eight million people watched the programme on 1 April 1957, and hundreds phoned in the following day to question the authenticity of the story or ask for more information about spaghetti cultivation and how they could grow their own spaghetti trees; the BBC told them to "place a sprig of spaghetti in a tin of tomato sauce and hope for the best".

See also
 List of April Fools' Day jokes
 Pacific Northwest tree octopus
 Lenin was a mushroom
 Mockumentary

References

External links

 
 
  Video link on that page is dead.
  With transcript and background.
 
 
 

April Fools' Day jokes
Performance hoaxes
BBC controversies
Fictional trees
1957 in the United Kingdom
Mockumentaries
1957 in British television
Hoaxes in the United Kingdom
Journalistic hoaxes
1950s hoaxes
Spaghetti
Practical jokes